The Tofu Cape is a cape in Su'ao Township, Yilan County, Taiwan.

Name

The cape got its name because the rock on the area resembles tofu.

Ecology
The cape provides a natural shelter for the sea fish nearby.

Activities
There is hiking trail along the coastal line of the cape. The area is also popular for scuba diving.

Transportation
The cape is accessible within walking distance southeast of Su'ao Station of Taiwan Railways.

See also
 Geology of Taiwan

References

Headlands of Taiwan
Landforms of Yilan County, Taiwan
Tourist attractions in Yilan County, Taiwan